Director's Kut Productions is an Indian television production company based in Mumbai, which is owned by Rajan Shahi. Established in 2007, it produces television shows and web-series for various channels. Some of its notable works include: Sapna Babul Ka... Bidaai, Yeh Rishta Kya Kehlata Hai, Yeh Rishtey Hain Pyaar Ke, Aai Kuthe Kay Karte and Anupamaa.

History
Rajan Shahi did his schooling from St Columbus, and got graduated from Hindu College, Delhi, and came to Mumbai.

In 1993, Shahi started his career as an assistant director. In 1999, Shahi made his directorial debut with the series Dil Hai Ki Manta Nahi. He then went on to direct series like Jassi Jaissi Koi Nahin, Hamare Tumhare, Rishtey, Kareena Kareena, Reth, Mamtaa, Millee, Virasaat and Saathi Re. Thereafter he worked as a series director for Saat Phere: Saloni Ka Safar, Ghar Ki Laxmi Betiyaan and Maayaka.

Eventually, he became a television producer and started his own production company in 2007. His first series as producer was Sapna Babul Ka...Bidaai on Star Plus, followed by Shital Tai, Yeh Rishta Kya Kehlata Hai, Chand Chupa Badal Mein and Tere Sheher Mein on Star Plus.

In 2019, they started producing Yeh Rishtey Hain Pyaar Ke which is a spin-off of Yeh Rishta Kya Kehlata Hai on the latter show's success. In 2019, the production house entered in Marathi GEC space and produce Marathi serial Aai Kuthe Kay Karte! for Star Network's Marathi channel Star Pravah. The Serial was later remade in Hindi as Anupamaa on Star Plus which premiered on 13 July 2020.

They also made a short film named Yolk for International film festival. They have a YouTube channel named First Kut Productions.

Current productions

Television series

Upcoming broadcast

Former productions

Web series

Controversies
 When Hina Khan and Karan Mehra quit Yeh Rishta Kya Kehlata Hai in June 2016 and November 2016 respectively then producer Rajan Shahi exclaimed that, "With due respect to both the actors, it is a fact that after Naitik (Karan’s character) left, we could consolidate our position much stronger and the TRPs actually increased. Likewise, after Hina’s exit, the show has grown."This badly hurt Hina and Karan and the production house landed into a controversy. In response to the interview, a hurt Hina Khan, "I don’t want to get into this blame game. Well, he can say whatever he wishes to." She further added, "why was he quiet when we were part of the show for eight long years? During that time, he went on record to praise both of us for our dedication and professionalism. And honestly, we were probably the only lead pair on television who continued to be with the show for eight consecutive years. Despite the work pressure, disagreements and other work opportunities, we continued to stay loyal to the show and supported the producer." While Karan said, "Everyone on the set and the channel knows my work and attendance records. If he is saying that I worked for two-three hours, he is referring to someone else because my attendance register is the proof. Also, I gave my notice period in advance. I don't know who he has a grudge against and why is he saying it now? I was thanked by the channel and Rajan sir when I quit, so I don't understand how this has emerged now. Honestly, I am happy in my space and looking forward to new beginnings. I am not in touch with him anymore and I can't keep commenting on other people's grievances. All I can say is, 'To each his own'."
The production company and producer Rajan Shahi again faced a controversy in July 2022 with actor Paras Kalnawat who portrayed "Samar Shah" in Anupamaa when the latter decided to participate in rival channel's dance-based reality show Jhalak Dikhhla Jaa 10 and he terminated Kalnawat's contract quotting "We as a production house won’t entertain breach of contract. We have terminated his services as an actor with immediate effect. We wish him all the best for his future endeavors". While Paras said, "Everything is great with Anupamaa but I did not see my character evolving. I have huge respect for Rajan sir and the team and wish them all the best. At this stage of my career, I wanted to take up a new challenge. Also, I must add that I did inform the production about my decision, however, due to the channel and contract clauses, it wouldn’t have been possible for me to continue with Anupamaa after signing Jhalak". He further said, "My character never evolved since past one year and after Anagha's exit I was just reduced to a family member standing in background with nothing to do" and he signed off calling whatever happened was a "nightmare" and "sigh of relief" as makers asked him to choose between the two revealing many dark secrets of the production house including his return to show within five days of his father's demise as leads were tested COVID-19 positive.

References

External links
 Official website

 

Television production companies of India
Companies based in Mumbai
Mass media companies established in 2007
2007 establishments in Maharashtra
Indian companies established in 2007